Lady is the stage name of Shameka Shanta Brown (born July 31, 1989), an American rapper. She was signed to rapper Plies' record label Big Gates Records on April 1, 2010. She has released three albums. Lady's songs have been featured on TV shows including Girls, Ray Donovan, and Skins.

Early life and education
Brown was born in Talbotton, Georgia. She graduated from Central High School in Talbotton in 2007. During her senior year at Central, Brown was class president.

Career
On April 1, 2010, Brown signed a record deal with the independent recording label Big Gates Records. She released the mixtapes Bitch From Around the Way, Bitch From Around the Way II, and Bout Dat Life.

Lady's song "Yankin" was featured in the HBO television series Girls and her song "Twerk" was featured in Showtime's television series Ray Donovan. The UK's Channel 4 show Skins has used her track "I Need". Lady and her songs have been discussed on Howard Stern's radio talk show, The Howard Stern Show.

Discography
Mixtapes
 2010: Bitch From Around The Way
 2010: Bitch From Around The Way 2
 2011: Bout Dat Life with Andre Lightskin
 2011: Jack Yo Shit with Andre Lightskin
 2011: Bonafide Bitch
 TBA: Jack Yo Shit 2
 TBA: Lip Service

References

External links
 

African-American women rappers
African-American women singer-songwriters
Rappers from Georgia (U.S. state)
Southern hip hop musicians
1989 births
Living people
People from Talbotton, Georgia
21st-century American rappers
Interscope Records artists
21st-century African-American women singers
Singer-songwriters from Georgia (U.S. state)
21st-century women rappers